Hit Parade 2 is a compilation album by The Wedding Present released in January 1993. Having decided to release a limited edition single every month for all of 1992 (each featuring an original track on the A side and a cover version on the B side) the group subsequently compiled the songs as two LPs called Hit Parade 1 and Hit Parade 2. In 2003, a double CD  was issued called simply The Hit Parade.

A different recording of "Boing!" than the one found on the original 7" single was used on all subsequent album editions - the single edition was produced by Jimmy Miller (who also produced "Flying Saucer"), the re-recording by Brian Paulson (who also produced the remaining singles). The original video for this track was also omitted from the VHS compilation Dick York's Wardrobe.

Track listing
"Flying Saucer"
"Boing!"
"Love Slave"
"Sticky"
"The Queen of Outer Space"
"No Christmas"
"Rocket" (Mud)
"Theme from Shaft" (Isaac Hayes)
"Chant of the Ever Circling Skeletal Family" (David Bowie)
"Go Wild in the Country" (Bow Wow Wow)
"U.F.O." (Barry Gray)
"Step into Christmas" (Elton John)

Early copies of the LP and CD formats came with an extra disc comprising BBC radio session versions of all 12 A-sides. These tracks have all been subsequently reissued on various CD compilations.

1993 compilation albums
The Wedding Present albums